Glamour Girl is a 1948 musical film starring Gene Krupa.

Cast
Gene Krupa
Virginia Grey as Lorraine Royle
Michael Duane as Johnny Evans
Susan Reed as Jennie Higgins
Jimmy Lloyd as Buddy Butterfield

Production
The film was originally known as I Surrender Dear. The title was re-used in another film.

References

External links

Glamour Girl at IMDb
Review of film at Variety

1948 films
American musical films
Columbia Pictures films
1948 musical films
American black-and-white films
Films directed by Arthur Dreifuss
1940s American films